The Ghana Congress Party was founded in May 1952 by Kofi Busia who also its leader. The party was formed by dissatisfied former Convention People's Party members, along with the United Gold Coast Convention (UGCC) and the National Democratic Party, which had both suffered poor performances in the 1951 elections, and soon dissolved. The party contested the 1954 election, winning one out of 104 seats. The party represented the conservative position of the chiefs and intelligentsia who were dominant in the UGCC.

After the Gold Coast legislative election in 1954, Busia and others went on to join the National Liberation Movement.

References

Defunct political parties in Ghana
Political parties established in 1952
1952 establishments in Gold Coast (British colony)